Woburn is a suburb of Lower Hutt, Wellington situated at the bottom of the North Island of New Zealand.

Henry Petre farmed the area in the 1840s and named the area after the Duke of Bedford's estate, Woburn Abbey. Petre's farm was later taken over by Daniel and Harriet Riddiford, whose descendants built a large home there, with the land being gradually subdivided.  Riddiford Street in Lower Hutt commemorates them.

Demographics

Woburn had a population of 1,752 at the 2018 New Zealand census, an increase of 60 people (3.5%) since the 2013 census, and an increase of 18 people (1.0%) since the 2006 census. There were 660 households. There were 831 males and 921 females, giving a sex ratio of 0.9 males per female. The median age was 43.1 years (compared with 37.4 years nationally), with 279 people (15.9%) aged under 15 years, 321 (18.3%) aged 15 to 29, 849 (48.5%) aged 30 to 64, and 300 (17.1%) aged 65 or older.

Ethnicities were 71.9% European/Pākehā, 8.9% Māori, 2.6% Pacific peoples, 23.6% Asian, and 2.2% other ethnicities (totals add to more than 100% since people could identify with multiple ethnicities).

The proportion of people born overseas was 30.0%, compared with 27.1% nationally.

Although some people objected to giving their religion, 45.0% had no religion, 40.8% were Christian, 5.8% were Hindu, 0.7% were Muslim, 1.2% were Buddhist and 2.1% had other religions.

Of those at least 15 years old, 561 (38.1%) people had a bachelor or higher degree, and 156 (10.6%) people had no formal qualifications. The median income was $41,300, compared with $31,800 nationally. The employment status of those at least 15 was that 738 (50.1%) people were employed full-time, 243 (16.5%) were part-time, and 45 (3.1%) were unemployed.

References

External links
The Town of Woburn, A Place of Destiny (1938 article)

Suburbs of Lower Hutt
Populated places on Te Awa Kairangi / Hutt River